This is the discography of American record producer and disc jockey DJ Clue?.

Albums

Studio albums

Soundtrack albums

Mixtapes
 Heatwave (1994)
 Back To School (1994)
 Halloween Holdup (1994)
 Back To School Pt. II: Final Exam (1994)
 Birthday '95 (1995)
 I-95 (1995)
 Spring Pt. 1 (1995)
 Spring Pt. 2: Double Flava (1995)
 Spring Vol. 3 (1995)
 Bad Boy Mixtape (1995)
 Summertime Shootout (1995)
 Summertime II (1995)
 Dedication (1995)
 Fall Flava (1995)
 Halloween Holdup Part. II (1995)
 Something For The Radio (1995)
 Birthday Blizzard (1996)
 Dedication 2 (1996)
 Springtime Stickup Pt. 1 (1996)
 Springtme Stickup Pt. II: The Payback (1996)
 Summatyme Shootout 2 (1996)
 4, 5, 6 (Going for Broke) (1996)
 R&B Pt. 1: Just Cruisin (1996)
 The Fall Out (1996)
 Holiday Holdup 1996 (1996)
 Show Me The Money (1997)
 Show Me The Money Pt. 2 (1997)
 R&B Part 2 Just Cruisin Again (1997)
 Cluemanatti (1997)
 Cluemanatti Pt. 2: The Rematch (1997)
 Platinum Plus (1997)
 Triple Platinum (1997)
 DJ Clue for President (1998)
 DJ Clue for President 2 (1998)
 Clue for President III: New Acuzations! (1998)
 Desert Storm "98" Clunino (1998)
 This Is It (1998)
 This Is It Part 2 (1998)
 You Can't Impeach The President (1999)
 The Ruler's Back (1999)
 The Ruler's Back Pt. 2 (1999)
 Queens Day Part One (1999)
 The Great Ones Pt. 1 (2000)
 The Great Ones Pt. 2 (2000)
 The Great Ones Pt. 3 (2000)
  The Perfect Desert Storm (2000)
 Stadium Series (2000)
 William M Holla (2000)
 William M Holla 2 (2001)
 Hev E. Components Pts. 1-3 (2001)
 Mixtapes For Dummies (2001)
 Show You How To Do This (2002)
 Hate Me Now (2002)
 Hate Me Now 2 (2002)
 Hate Me Now 3 (2002)
 Holiday Holdup '02 (2002)
 Please Don't Throw Rocks at the Throne (2003)
 Where Da Hood At? (2003)
 Where Da Hood At? Pt. 2 (2003)
 Where Da Hood At? Pt. 3 (2003)
 Thee American Idol (2003)
 Thee American Idol Part 2 (2004)
 Man On Fire (2004)
 New York Giant (2004)
 Cherry Lounge (2004)
 He's A Pro! (2005)
 Fidel Cashflow (2005)
 Desert Storm Radio, Vol.1 (with DJ Storm) (2006)
 The Incredible (2006)
 It's Me Snitches (2007)
 Desert Storm Radio, Vol.8 (2008)
 TV volume 1 (2008)
Desert Storm Radio: The Takeover (2012)
Banned From CD 2015 Part One (2015)

Singles

References 

Hip hop discographies
Discographies of American artists